Nathaniel Collins (born 12 August 1996) is a Scottish professional boxer who has held the Commonwealth featherweight title 2021 and the British featherweight title since March 2023.

Professional career 
Collins made his professional debut on 6 October 2018, scoring a four-round points decision (PTS) victory against Lee Connelly at the Lagoon Leisure Centre in Paisley, Scotland.

After compiling a record of 5–0 (1 KO), he faced Monty Ogilvie for the vacant Celctic featherweight title on 5 October 2019, at the Lagoon Leisure Centre. Collins scored five knockdowns en route to a fifth-round technical knockout (TKO) victory to capture his first professional championship.

After a PTS victory against Jordan Ellison in a non-title fight in January 2021, Collins faced Felix Williams for the vacant Commonwealth featherweight title on 31 July at the New Douglas Park in Hamilton, Scotland. Collins captured the title via third-round TKO.

Professional boxing record

References

External links 

Living people
1996 births
Scottish male boxers
Featherweight boxers
Southpaw boxers
Commonwealth Boxing Council champions